Cristaldo is a surname. It may refer to:

 Blas Cristaldo (born 1964), Paraguayan former footballer
 Christopher Cristaldo (born 1995), Australian footballer 
 Ernesto Cristaldo (born 1984), Paraguayan footballer
 Franco Cristaldo (born 1996), Argentine footballer
 Gustavo Cristaldo (born 1989), Paraguayan footballer
 Jonathan Cristaldo (born 1989), Argentine footballer
 Luis Cristaldo (born 1969), Argentine former footballer
 Victor Cristaldo (born 1967), Australian former footballer
 Wanderson Cristaldo Farias (born 1988), Brazilian footballer